The Shamrock Bowl Conference is the top competition league in the Irish American Football League.

The league is divided into two divisions for the 2017 season, the SBC North and SBC South.

References